(originally released in North America as Jet Grind Radio) is a 2000 action game developed by Smilebit and published by Sega for the Dreamcast. The player controls a member of a youth gang, the GGs, as they use inline skates to traverse Tokyo, spraying graffiti, challenging rival gangs, and evading authorities.

Development was headed by director Masayoshi Kikuchi, with art by Ryuta Ueda. The influence was drawn from late 1990s Japanese popular culture such as the rhythm game PaRappa the Rapper, and the anti-establishment themes in the film Fight Club. The environments were based on Tokyo shopping districts in Shibuya and Shinjuku, with graffiti designed by artists including Eric Haze. It was the first game to use a cel-shaded art style, developed in response to the team's disappointment towards the then-late 1990s library of Sega games overly consisting primarily of fantasy and sci-fi genre games.

Jet Set Radio received acclaim and is considered one of the best video games ever made for its graphics, soundtrack and gameplay. It won several awards and was nominated for many others. A Game Boy Advance version, developed by Vicarious Visions, was released in 2003, along with versions for Japanese mobile phones. In 2012, Jet Set Radio was digitally re-released for the Xbox 360, PlayStation 3 and iOS, followed by releases for Windows, PlayStation Vita and Android. A sequel, Jet Set Radio Future,  was released for the Xbox in 2002.

Gameplay 

The player controls a member of a gang of graffiti-tagging inline skaters. The game consists of three types of levels: Street, Rival Showdown, and Trial. The Street levels come in two categories. The first is to tag every graffiti point in each area previously tagged by a rival gang before the timer runs out while evading the authorities. The second category serves as a boss battle by chasing the rival gang members and spraying graffiti on them. The more graffiti points are sprayed, the more deadly the authorities become. Graffiti points are marked by arrows and require paint to tag them. Players can spray graffiti by either pressing a single button or inputting commands using the analog stick depending on the size of the graffiti spot. Players are unable to spray graffiti if they run out of paint, which must be refilled by obtaining yellow and blue spray cans scattered across the stage. Yellow spray cans refill a single spray can, and blue spray cans refill five. Enemies will pursue players and attempt to deplete their health. Health can be replenished by obtaining red and green spray cans. Performing tricks adds bonus points to the player's overall score and can help the player gain access to areas difficult to reach.

In Rival Showdown levels, more playable characters can be unlocked after they are defeated by matching the rival's movements in technique sections or by spraying graffiti before the rival in race sections. Trial levels are unlocked after Street and Rival Showdown levels are cleared in a specific area. There are three kinds of trials: Jet Graffiti, Jet Tech, and Jet Crash. In Jet Graffiti, the objective is to spray all the graffiti points within the time limit. Jet Tech prioritizes in obtaining the top score within the time limit. In Jet Crash, the objective is to reach the goal and spray graffiti on it before the opponent. Players can customize their graffiti by choosing presets, or create their own using the Graffiti editor. By using a VMU, players can upload their graffiti to the official website for other players to use or download graffiti from other players. More Graffiti presets can be unlocked by collecting Graffiti Soul icons scattered throughout stages.

Plot 
DJ Professor K broadcasts the pirate radio station Jet Set Radio to gangs of youths known as the Rudies, who roam Tokyo-to, skating and spraying graffiti. One gang, the GGs, competes for turf with the all-female jilted lovers Love Shockers in the shopping districts of Shibuya-Cho, the cyborg otaku Noise Tanks in the Benten entertainment district, and the kaiju-loving Poison Jam in the Kogane dockyard. The authorities, led by Captain Onishima, pursue the gangs with riot police and military armaments. After the GGs defeat Poison Jam, Noise Tanks, and Love Shockers in turf wars, they each drop a piece of a mysterious vinyl record. Professor K says that the mysterious vinyl record collected is The Devil's Contract and has the power to summon a demon.

The GGs are joined by Combo and Cube, who explain that their hometown, Grind City, has been overtaken by the Rokkaku Group business conglomerate. They ask the GGs to help them to free their friend, Coin, who has been captured by the Rokkaku Group, due to their interest in his massive vinyl collection. The Rokkaku pursue the GGs and steal The Devil's Contract. Poison Jam explains that the Rokkaku CEO, Goji Rokkaku, plans to use the record to make a contract with the demon and take over the world. The GGs defeat Goji in the rooftop of his headquarters by destroying his turntable and render him powerless to the evil powers summoned by tagging his forehead. Freedom is returned to the streets of Tokyo-to. In a twist, Combo reveals that The Devil's Contract is an old record with no demonic powers and that wealth had driven Goji to insanity. DJ Professor K addresses to those with doubts in his audience that this story is up to them to believe, but he ends the transmission with "On the streets, there's no such thing as 'The End'!"

Development 

Jet Set Radio was developed by Smilebit, a Sega studio formed from members of Team Andromeda, the developers of the Panzer Dragoon games for the Sega Saturn. The development team consisted of fewer than 25 developers, with an average age of under 25. Programming began in mid-1999. The game was announced at the 1999 Tokyo Game Show and drew media attention for its cel-shaded style. During the early stages of development, director Masayoshi Kikuchi had difficulty leading the team without prior directing experience. The visual style was established prior to the gameplay; according to Kikuchi, it could have become an adventure game or role-playing game. His superiors were not satisfied with early concepts, and so Kikuchi used trial and error to develop a concept that he believed everyone would find interesting.

Ueda wanted to create something "cool" that dealt with popular culture and was completely unlike the team's previous game, the 1998 role-playing game Panzer Dragoon Saga. Ueda's drawings of a punky character with headphones and rollerblades became the foundation of the game. Ueda had joined Sega after being impressed by the "freshness" and international appeal of Sonic the Hedgehog, but was disappointed with the excessive focused saturation of overtly fantastical manga and anime-style designs, and hoped to create something original. Smilebit drew inspiration from games outside the typical game genres of science fiction and fantasy. Ueda was particularly inspired by a demonstration of the PlayStation rhythm game PaRappa the Rapper at the 1996 Tokyo Game Show: "I think that's the first game with pop culture like that. They did it first. After that I decided to make a true game, not just a visual experience, that was actually for adults." The anti-establishment themes of the 1999 film Fight Club were another influence.

Smilebit used thicker lines for stand-out objects. Smilebit developed a new cel-shading technique not used at the time as it would not have been possible on the Dreamcast or PlayStation 2. The game features graffiti by a variety of artists, including Eric Haze, who had designed album art for acts including the Beastie Boys and Public Enemy. Smilebit initially planned to make a skateboarding game, but this was changed due to the legs having to be fixed.

Jet Set Radio was one of the earliest games to feature an open 3D world, which presented the team's biggest challenge. Kikuchi said: "Making an entire town in a game was quite the prospect. It's not hard with modern hi-spec hardware, but that wasn't the case back then... It was very difficult from a programming standpoint." Another Sega game developed in that period, Shenmue (1999), also featured an open world, but Kikuchi said the games posed different technical challenges, as Shenmue does not allow the player to jump or move at speed. The team implemented grinding to allow players to enjoy speed without worrying about colliding with obstacles. Smilebit chose to have a fixed camera as an attempt to reduce motion sickness. They attempted to make the game impossible to duplicate on PlayStation 2 by pushing the Dreamcast limitations using bright colors, realistic shadows, and more than sixteen NPCs on-screen without lag that would have been impossible on PS2 due to its smaller memory.

The settings were inspired by Japanese locations such as the Tokyo shopping districts of Shibuya and Shinjuku, which Smilebit photographed to use as references. Sega feared that the game's style might alienate players outside Japan and requested changes for the international versions. The team added stages modeled after New York City: one based on Times Square, and another on Roosevelt Avenue along Queens and Brooklyn, and changed the nationality of two characters to American. The interactive credits sequence of the Japanese version was also cut, as localizing it would have meant rebuilding the stage with English names. Sega sold the international version in Japan as De La Jet Set Radio. Ueda was unhappy about the changes, which he said diminished the essential Japanese elements of the game.

Soundtrack 
The Jet Set Radio soundtrack includes original and licensed tracks with a variety of genres including J-pop, hip hop, funk, electronic dance, rock, acid jazz, and trip hop. The main theme of the game is called "Let Mom Sleep". The North American version and international rereleases add metal songs. The 2012 port omits "Yappie Feet" and "Many Styles" for licensing reasons. The music has been described as energetic, rhythm-heavy, defiant, and multicultural. Most of the soundtrack was composed by Hideki Naganuma, with additional tracks by Richard Jacques, Deavid Soul, Toronto, and B.B. Rights.  Naganuma attempted to match the visual style, and experimented with voices, cutting, and rearranging samples to the point that they became nonsensical. In 2012, Naganuma said Jet Set Radio and its sequel had been his favorite projects. Smilebit worked with Sega of America and Sega of Europe to include as many street culture elements as possible, hoping to create music that was internationally acceptable.

Jet Set Radio Original Soundtrack was distributed by Polydor Records on December 20, 2000, in Japan. For the HD release, a new soundtrack was distributed by Sumthing Else on September 18, 2012, for North America and Europe and contained additional tracks from the sequel, Jet Set Radio Future. A second soundtrack for the HD version, Jet Set Radio: Sega Original Tracks, was distributed by Sega and released on iTunes on October 3, 2012.

Promotion and release 
Jet Set Radio was released in Japan on June 29, 2000. In North America, it was released on October 31 as Jet Grind Radio due to trademark problems for "Jet Set" in the United States at the time. The PAL version was released later on November 24 under the original name. The North American and PAL versions contained two new maps, new songs, and other in-game content designed to increase the game's appeal to Western audiences. To promote the North American release, Sega of America held a "Graffiti is Art" competition for contestants to enter their own graffiti art pieces to Sega. Sega chose five finalists and flew them into San Francisco, California on October 21, where they competed to make graffiti art pieces on a canvas within a 3 and a half-hour timeframe for a prize of $5000. Mayor of San Francisco, Willie Brown discovered the competition and attempted to revoke Sega of America's permit, but was unsuccessful due to obtaining the permit legally.

Sega re-released the game in Japan under the name  This version was released on October 18, 2001, in Japan via Dreamcast Direct (later renamed Sega Direct) and included a T-shirt featuring the protagonist Beat for those who pre-ordered. This version features content that was originally exclusive to PAL and North American versions, namely music, two playable characters, and two stages.

Alternative versions

Mobile versions 

Jet Set Radio was remade as two 2D mobile versions. The first,  a side-scrolling game in which players escape police, was released for Japanese mobile phones by Sega on June 22, 2001. It was followed by a remake for Game Boy Advance developed by Vicarious Visions and published by THQ in North America on June 26, 2003, and in Europe on February 20, 2004. The Game Boy Advance version uses the Tony Hawk's Pro Skater 2 engine and an isometric perspective, and it emulates the cel-shaded graphics of the Dreamcast game, with some original stages and shortened songs.

High-definition remaster 
In 2012, high-definition ports developed by BlitWorks were released for PlayStation 3, Xbox 360, Windows, PlayStation Vita, iOS, and Android. The ports add features, including widescreen HD graphics, online leaderboards, achievements, and a new camera system. It combines the North American, European, and Japanese versions' soundtracks and adds bonus tracks from Jet Set Radio Future, but it omits the PAL version's tracks "Yappie Feet" and "Many Styles". To promote the ports, Sega ran a contest to allow players to submit their own artwork to be used as graffiti within the game. The game was made backwards-compatible with the Xbox One in May 2016.

In North America, the PS3 version was released on September 18, with PlayStation Plus members able to purchase it early on September 11. The PS3 version was released in Europe the following day alongside The Xbox Live Arcade and Windows version for both North America and Europe. The PlayStation Vita version was scheduled for release on October 16, but was delayed for development optimization reasons; it was released on November 20 in North America and in Europe the following day. The PS3, Xbox 360, and PlayStation Vita versions were released in Japan simultaneously on February 20, 2013.

The iOS and Android versions were released in North America and Europe on November 29, 2012. Japan received the iOS version on December 20, 2012 and Android on January 30, 2013. The smartphone versions were delisted as of 2015 due to compatibility problems with iOS updates.

Reception

Critical reception
Jet Set Radio received acclaim for its gameplay, visual style, and music. Gamers' Republic called it flawless. IGN praised the extra gameplay modes, saying they added replay value. Official Dreamcast Magazine (ODCM) found the exaggerated physics and interactivity of the levels immersive. DC-UK described the gameplay as a combination of Crazy Taxi and Tony Hawk and concluded that the gameplay was better than both. GameSpot praised the pacing, stating that the beginning of the game is simple and slowly becomes more challenging as the player progresses. GameFan was not impressed with the early stages, but their opinion changed as they progressed the game and were happy with the result. Next Generation found the story modifications of the English versions jarring, although, he complimented the new stages, calling them "impressive" and "a worthy addition to Japanese cityscapes of the original". The camera controls were commonly criticized, but most reviewers said the overall quality outweighed them.

IGN said the visual style "looks like a moving cartoon, and every character, right down to the police dogs, is practically overflowing with personality ... It has the type of look that makes non-gamers can't help but be impressed". ODCM called it "gorgeous" and compared it to the move to color television. DC-UK also praised it for resembling a 2D cartoon in 3D space, and considered it ground-breaking. GamePro wrote that the visuals were unique and that the stylized design was convincing and fun.

GamePro called Jet Set Radio one of the best-sounding games of the year for its soundtrack, and ODCM said it had "one of the best soundtracks ever". IGN also praised the soundtrack, but was critical of the tracks added to the North American release, in particular songs from Rob Zombie. Next Generation, however, did not consider the new tracks to make a difference, stating the soundtrack was incredible from the start. GameSpot said the soundtrack fit perfectly into the game's environment.

When reviewing the HD remaster, the game received mixed reactions from critics. GamesRadar+ praised how it is a joy to play even 12 years after its release. Eurogamer also gave positive statements,  calling the visual style "timeless", and complimented the HD remaster, stating "12 years on and this is a surprisingly rigorous game built of oddball delights, then, and the HD updating has only enhanced its charms. The skating's still great, the city's still a joy to explore, and the soundtrack's still one of the very best ever put together". Game Informer was more critical, opining that the gameplay was archaic and frustrating. Game Informer further elaborated that in retrospect, the originally released visual style blinded them from its faulty gameplay. Both TouchArcade and Pocket Gamer criticized smartphone versions for the touchscreen controls and unable to keep up with the tasks the game requires.

Across all versions of the game combined, including the original and re-releases sales of Jet Set Radio surpassed 1 million copies worldwide.

Accolades
Jet Set Radio won the Best Console Game at the E3 Game Critics Awards in 2000 and was the runner up for Best in Show at the same event. The game won the category of "Excellence in Visual Arts" award, received a "Game Spotlights Award" and was nominated for Game of the year at the 2001 Game Developers Choice Awards. It was nominated for Game Design, Game of the Year, Console Game of the Year, Console Innovation, Original Music Composition, Sound Design, and Visual Engineering at the 4th Annual Interactive Achievement Awards in 2001. It won GameSpot's annual "Best Graphics, Artistic" award among console games, and was nominated in the "Best Game Music" and "Best Platform Game" categories. Gamers' Republic awarded it "Best 3D Game Design" in its 2000 Year in Review. The game was also featured in 1001 Video Games You Must Play Before You Die.

Legacy 
Jet Set Radio is recognized as one of the first games to feature cel-shaded graphics, with exaggerated shapes, thick lines, and flat, bright colors. Insomniac owner Ted Price credited it as an influence on their game Sunset Overdrive. Numerous indie developers have cited Jet Set Radio as a major influence on their games, the most notable being the successfully crowdfunded Hover: Revolt of Gamers, Lethal League, and Bomb Rush Cyberfunk, all of which draw heavy inspiration from Jet Set Radios visuals and music and feature contributions from its composer, Hideki Naganuma. The game has also been speedrun at Games Done Quick multiple times. Other fan community-based Jet Set Radio projects include Jet Set Radio Live, a 24/7 browser-based radio station based on the fictional radio station in-game created in January 2016 and the albums Memories of Tokyo-To released on February 20, 2018 and Sounds of Tokyo-To Future by American musician 2 Mello on August 24, 2021.

A sequel, Jet Set Radio Future, was released for the Xbox in 2002, early in the system's life cycle. Two main characters, Beat and Gum, are playable characters in Sega Superstars Tennis and Sonic & All-Stars Racing Transformed, and the former appears in Sonic Universe issue #45, an adaptation of the game along with Sonic & Sega All-Stars Racing.

In 2009, an early antagonist in the game, Captain Onishima, was ranked 95th in IGN's "Top 100 Videogame Villains" list. Jet Set Radio and Jet Set Radio Future are highly requested games to be ported to the Xbox One, the Xbox Series X/S, and the Nintendo Switch. In 2021, Sega teased the possibility of a Jet Set Radio reboot, and announced Beat as a playable character for Super Monkey Ball: Banana Mania.

Notes

References

External links
Restoration of the original Official American website
Official Japanese website

2000 video games
3D platform games
Action video games
Android (operating system) games
Dreamcast games
Graffiti video games
IOS games
Java platform games
PlayStation 3 games
PlayStation Network games
PlayStation Vita games
Roller skating video games
Sega Games franchises
Sega video games
Organized crime video games
Single-player video games
Smilebit games
THQ games
Video games featuring protagonists of selectable gender
Video games scored by Hideki Naganuma
Video games scored by Richard Jacques
Video games set in Japan
Video games with cel-shaded animation
Video games with isometric graphics
Windows games
Xbox 360 games
Xbox 360 Live Arcade games
J2ME games
Game Developers Choice Award winners
Video games developed in Japan
Video games developed in the United States
BlitWorks games